King George's Park is a main park spanning Wandsworth and Southfields, South London.

Summary 

The park was originally called Southfields Park and was laid out in 1922. It was officially opened by King George V in 1923. The Wandle forms the eastern boundary. It has three areas of approximately equal size. In the north is a leisure area; in the centre is a play area; in the south are sports fields.

Details 
The leisure area includes formal gardens, a bowling green, tennis courts, a wild-fowl lake (at one time with row boats), and shaded paths with many seats. As this is less than five minutes' walk from the main shopping area of Wandsworth, it is, in summer, a great place for eating picnic lunches.

The play area has a pavilion where children's play sessions are held (the One O'Clock Club). There was a small open-air swimming pool, but this was closed and has been removed.  Also there is an ecological site and an adventure playground. There are paths for walking and for cycling, and a wide open grass field for ball sports, formal and informal.

The Wandle trail passes through the park.

The park can be entered through gates at the north and south ends, and on the east via a footpath with its own bridge across the Wandle.

References and footnotes

External links

 King George's Park (Wandsworth Council)
 Photos of the park 

Parks and open spaces in the London Borough of Wandsworth